Mary Alicia Rhett (February 1, 1915 – January 3, 2014) was an American actress and portrait painter who is best remembered for her role as India Wilkes in the 1939 epic film Gone with the Wind. At the time of her death, Rhett was one of the oldest surviving credited cast members of the movie.

Early years
Rhett was born in 1915 at Savannah, Georgia to Isobel Murdoch, an immigrant from Liverpool, England, and Edmund M. Rhett, an American army officer and engineer based in Savannah. Her grandfather was Col. Alfred Moore Rhett, the commander of the 1st South Carolina Artillery for most of the civil war, and her great grandfather was Robert Barnwell Rhett, Alfred Rhett's father. After her father's death during World War I, Alicia and her mother moved to Charleston, South Carolina. Rhett became a theatre actress in Charleston. A newspaper article in 1939 quoted a Selznick International Pictures news release as saying that Rhett Butler's first name was chosen by Margaret Mitchell because "Since earliest Colonial days, the Rhett family has occupied a prominent position in the South generally, and, more particularly, in and around Charleston, S.C."

Alicia Rhett graduated from Memminger High School in Charleston.

Gone with the Wind
During a performance of The Recruiting Officer in 1936, Rhett was spotted by Hollywood director George Cukor, who was impressed by her charm and beauty. The director was scouting for an actress to play the role of Scarlett O'Hara after producer David Selznick purchased the film rights to the Margaret Mitchell novel. Previously, she had been suggested by talent scout Kay Brown as a possible Southern belle for the film.

Rhett auditioned for the part of Melanie Hamilton, but the role went instead to Olivia de Havilland. In March 1937, Cukor offered Rhett the role of India Wilkes, sister of Ashley Wilkes. After the success of Gone with the Wind, Rhett left Hollywood and returned to South Carolina and retired from filmmaking in 1941, citing a lack of suitable roles. Rhett later became an accent coach for aspiring actors and a radio announcer at station WTMA in Charleston.

Portrait painter
Prior to appearing in Gone with the Wind, Rhett showed talent as a sketch artist and portrait painter. Between takes on Gone with the Wind, she made sketches and drawings of her fellow actors. Soon, Rhett was creating portraits of American servicemen in the Charleston vicinity. Some of her later works included portraits of Admiral Louis Emil Denfeld, and librarian Estellene P. Walker, the latter of which is on display in the South Carolina State Library. Coincidentally, Rhett was commissioned to paint the portrait of a then 19-year-old Charleston resident Alexandra Braid, later known as Alexandra Ripley, author of Scarlett (1991), the sequel to Gone with the Wind.

Rhett illustrated a number of books, including South Carolina Indians (1965), written by Beth Causey and Leila Darby. Of particular note, Charlotte Brown Lide commissioned Ms. Rhett to paint a portrait of her late husband, Claudius Murray Lide, Sr., and the same year painted a reproduction of William Harrison Scarborough's "The Miller Sisters". These two portraits are housed in the home of Claudius Murray Lide, Jr. in Columbia, South Carolina.

Death
Rhett died at age 98 of natural causes on January 3, 2014, at Bishop Gadsden Episcopal Retirement Community in her longtime hometown of Charleston, South Carolina. In her obituaries, Rhett was cited as "the oldest living actor from Gone With the Wind", being 17 months older than Dame Olivia de Havilland.

Alicia Rhett was laid to rest beside her parents at St. Philip's Episcopal Church Cemetery, in Charleston, South Carolina, under a large standing granite stone, marked by her name, dates, with the description, "Daughter of Edmund M. and Isobel M. Rhett -Portraitist".

Filmography

References

External links

New York Times biography

1915 births
2014 deaths
American film actresses
American women painters
Actors from Savannah, Georgia
Actresses from Charleston, South Carolina
American portrait painters
Artists from Georgia (U.S. state)
Artists from Charleston, South Carolina
Actresses from Georgia (U.S. state)
American people of English descent
20th-century American actresses
20th-century American painters
20th-century American women artists
21st-century American women